Times Record or The Times Record may refer to the following newspapers:
 Southwest Times Record, published in Fort Smith, Arkansas
 The Times-Record (Alabama), published in Fayette, Alabama
 The Times Record (Illinois), published in Aledo, Illinois
 The Times Record (Maine), published in Brunswick, Maine
 The Times-Record (Maryland), published in Denton, Maryland
 Times-Record (North Dakota), published in Valley City, North Dakota
 Times Record & Roane County Reporter, published in Spencer, West Virginia
 Times Record News, published in Wichita Falls, Texas
 The Record, published in Troy, New York

See also 
 Times Recorder